Allan Tai (born 29 January 1980) is a Malaysian former badminton player. He was part of the Malaysia junior team that won the silver medal at the 1998 Asian Junior Championships in the boys' team event. In 2001, Tai became the finalist at the India Satellite tournament, and in 2002, he won the Smiling Fish Satellite tournament in Thailand. The Kuala Lumpur borned, was the champion of the Asiatic Indahpura Badminton Championship in 2006 and 2007.

Achievements

IBF International 
Men's singles

References

External links
 
 

1980 births
Living people
Sportspeople from Kuala Lumpur
Malaysian sportspeople of Chinese descent
Malaysian male badminton players